Glasgow Partick was a burgh constituency represented in the House of Commons of the Parliament of the United Kingdom from 1918 until 1950.

Boundaries 

The previous 1885–1918 county constituency consisted of "So much of the Parish of Govan as lies north of the Clyde and beyond the present boundary of the municipal burgh of Glasgow, and so much of the parish of Barony as lies to the west of the present main line of railway between Glasgow and Edinburgh of the North British Railway Company (being the old Edinburgh and Glasgow Railway) and beyond the present boundary of the municipal burgh of Glasgow."

In 1918 the constituency consisted of "That portion of the city which is bounded by a line commencing at a point on the municipal boundary at the centre line of the North British Railway (Stobcross Branch), thence south-eastward along the centre line of the said North British Railway to the centre line of the River Kelvin, thence south-westward along the centre line of the River Kelvin to the centre line of the River Clyde, thence westward along the centre line of the River Clyde, to the municipal boundary, thence northward and north-eastward along the municipal boundary to the point of commencement."

Members of Parliament

Elections

Elections in the 1910s

Elections in the 1920s

Elections in the 1930s 

General Election 1939–40

Another General Election was required to take place before the end of 1940. The political parties had been making preparations for an election to take place and by the Autumn of 1939, the following candidates had been selected; 
Unionist: Arthur Young
Labour: Adam McKinlay

Elections in the 1940s

References 

Historic parliamentary constituencies in Scotland (Westminster)
Constituencies of the Parliament of the United Kingdom established in 1885
Constituencies of the Parliament of the United Kingdom disestablished in 1950
Politics of Glasgow
Partick